Dimitri Pachkoria (born December 7, 1991) is a Ukrainian footballer.

Career 
Pachkoria began his career in 2011 in the Ukrainian Second League with FC Skala Stryi. After three seasons with Skala he went abroad to play in the Erovnuli Liga with FC Dinamo Batumi, and later with FC Zugdidi. In 2017, he went overseas to play in the Canadian Soccer League with FC Vorkuta. In his debut season he assisted in securing the regular season title.

References 

1991 births
Living people
Ukrainian footballers
FC Skala Stryi (2004) players
FC Dinamo Batumi players
FC Zugdidi players
FC Continentals players
Canadian Soccer League (1998–present) players
Association football midfielders
Ukrainian Second League players